The Louisiana Christian Wildcats and Lady Wildcats are the athletic teams that represent Louisiana Christian University, located in Pineville, Louisiana, in intercollegiate sports as a member of the National Association of Intercollegiate Athletics (NAIA), primarily competing in the Red River Athletic Conference (RRAC) for most of its sports since the 2021–22 academic year; while its football team competes in the Sooner Athletic Conference (SAC). The Wildcats and Lady Wildcats previously competed in the American Southwest Conference (ASC) of the Division III ranks of the National Collegiate Athletic Association (NCAA) from 2000–01 to 2020–21; and in the NAIA's Gulf Coast Athletic Conference (GCAC) from 1981–82 to 1999–2000.

Varsity teams
Louisiana Christian competes in nine intercollegiate varsity sports: Men's sports include baseball, basketball, football, golf and soccer; while women's sports include basketball, soccer, softball and volleyball. Former sports included men's and women's cross country, women's golf, men's and women's tennis, and men's and women's track & field.

Baseball
The Louisiana Christian baseball team represents Louisiana Christian University in Pineville, Louisiana, United States. The school's team currently competes in the Red River Athletic Conference, which is part of the NAIA. The team plays its home games at Billy Allgood Field at Legacy Stadium.

Men's basketball
The Louisiana Christian men's basketball team represents Louisiana Christian University in Pineville, Louisiana, United States. The school's team currently competes in the Red River Athletic Conference, which is part of the NAIA. The team plays its home games at 4,800-seat H.O. West Fieldhouse.

Women's basketball
The Louisiana Christian women's basketball team represents Louisiana Christian University in Pineville, Louisiana, United States. The school's team currently competes in the Red River Athletic Conference, which is part of the NAIA. The team plays its home games at 4,800-seat H.O. West Fieldhouse.

Men's and women's cross country
The Louisiana Christian men's and women's cross country teams represent Louisiana Christian University in Pineville, Louisiana, United States. The school's teams currently competes in the Red River Athletic Conference, which is part of the NAIA.

Football
The Louisiana Christian Football team represents Louisiana Christian University in Pineville, Louisiana, United States. The school's team currently competes in the Sooner Athletic Conference, which is part of the NAIA. The team plays its home games at 7,000-seat Wildcat Field.

Men's and women's golf
The Louisiana Christian men's and women's golf teams represent Louisiana Christian University in Pineville, Louisiana, United States. The school's teams currently competes in the Red River Athletic Conference, which is part of the NAIA.

Men's and women's soccer
The Louisiana Christian men's and women's soccer teams represent Louisiana Christian University in Pineville, Louisiana, United States. The school's teams currently competes in the Red River Athletic Conference, which is part of the NAIA. The teams play their home games at 7,000-seat Wildcat Field.

Softball
The Louisiana Christian Softball team represents Louisiana Christian University in Pineville, Louisiana, United States. The school's team currently competes in the Red River Athletic Conference, which is part of the NAIA. The team plays its home games at Wildcat Park.

Men's and women's tennis
The Louisiana Christian men's and women's tennis teams represent Louisiana Christian University in Pineville, Louisiana, United States. The school's teams currently competes in the Red River Athletic Conference, which is part of the NAIA. The team plays its home matches at the Crowell Tennis Center.

Volleyball
The Louisiana Christian volleyball team represents Louisiana  Christian University in Pineville, Louisiana, United States. The school's team currently competes in the Red River Athletic Conference, which is part of the NAIA. The team plays its home games at 4,800-seat H.O. West Fieldhouse.

Athletic facilities
Billy Allgood Field at Legacy StadiumBilly Allgood Field at Legacy Stadium is a baseball stadium in Pineville, Louisiana. It is home to the Louisiana Christian baseball team.
Crowell Tennis CenterThe Richard L. Crowell Tennis Center is a tennis facility in Pineville, Louisiana. It is home to the Louisiana Christian men's and women's tennis teams. The facility opened in 1997.
H.O. West FieldhouseH.O. West Fieldhouse is a 4,800-seat arena in Pineville, Louisiana. It is home to the Louisiana Christian men's and women's basketball teams and volleyball team. The facility opened in 1964.
Wildcat FieldWildcat Field is a 7,000-seat multi-purpose stadium in Pineville, Louisiana. It is home to the Louisiana Christian football team and men's and women's soccer teams. The stadium officially opened on October 25, 2008.
Wildcat ParkWildcat Park is a softball park in Pineville, Louisiana. It is home to the Louisiana Christian softball team. The stadium opened in 2001.

References

External links
 Official website